Binh Tay Market is the Central Market of Cho Lon in District 6, Ho Chi Minh City, Vietnam.  Local Vietnamese refer to it as Chợ Lớn mới, while local Vietnamese-Chinese refer it as 堤岸 - 新街市 "The New Market of Chợ Lớn", and the Chinese other than those living in Vietnam known it only as 堤岸 (Dī'àn, or literally, "embankment").

"The Old Market" did exist in Cho Lon, its location is now the site of Cho Lon Post Office in District 5. It was destroyed in a raging fire (exact time unknown) and soon after, "The New Market" was built.  Although it was used extensively before the fire, local people rarely mention about this lost market except the elderly, or ones who has lived nearby long enough to know the history of this old market.

Geography 
Binh Tay Market is sitting on Thap Muoi Street (Vietnamese: Đường Tháp Mười), a four street-block span connecting Confucius Street (Vietnamese: Đường Khổng Tử - old French: Quai de Gaudot) to the North, and Hau Giang Street (Vietnamese: Đường Hậu Giang) to the South, on the edge of District 6.  It is the largest marketplace before the road leading West to Mien Tay of Vietnam, via a very important ground transportation hub named Xa Cảng Miền Tây. Despite many wars over the years, Binh Tay Market has always been a major business hub not only for the local Vietnamese and Chinese, but also for the Vietnamese farmers trading daily goods coming from all directions of South Vietnam.

Little-known history 

Bình Tây Market  was built, or at least heavily financially supported, by a Chinese businessman named Guo Tan (郭琰) better known as Quách Đàm, (1863–1927), originally hailing from Chaozhou in Guangdong. Quách Đàm operated his businesses under the trade name of Thông Hiệp, but he was best known by his nickname "Handicapped Thông" among local Chinese.  He started out very poor, making a living by recycling garbage and other used material; later, he began to enter into other types of businesses, in which he earned his fortune. There used to be a life-size bronze statue of Thông Hiệp standing right in the center of the  Bình Tây Market, surrounded by four bronze lions, and four bronze dragons spitting water into the fountain under in which the statue of Thông was standing. The full size statue of Thông was replaced with a smaller glass altar sometime between 1976 and 1980 for unknown reasons. Nowadays, that statue is located in the Fine Art Museum of Ho Chi Minh city. The four bronze lions and dragons are still standing .

References

External links 

Retail markets in Ho Chi Minh City
Clock towers in Vietnam